Puerto del Suspiro del Moro or Pass of the Moor's Sigh is a mountain pass in the Spanish Sierra Nevada.

History 
Muhammad XII, the last Moorish Sultan of Granada, and his court are said to have crossed this Alpujarras pass after being ejected from Granada by the Catholic Monarchs in 1492. Its name comes from the moment when he loudly sighed while looking back and longing for his Granada palaces, and in particular the Alhambra, an act which reportedly moved his mother Aisha to whip him, giving the famous quip "Yora, yora como mujer, lo que no supiste defender como hombre", meaning "Weep, weep like a woman, for that which you  have not been able to defend as a man."

External links
Spanish poem by Aguijarro detailedly describing the ordeal.

Suspiro del Moro
Reconquista
Penibaetic System
Landforms of Andalusia